Eren Güngör (born 2 April 1988) is a Turkish footballer who last played for Karabükspor and the Turkish national team. He plays as a central defender or a left-back.

Club career
Eren started his career playing for his local side Çamdibigücü, before moving to professional side Altay at the age of 14. He stayed with the first division club until the age of 19, when he signed a four-year contract with Süper Lig side Kayserispor.

International career
Eren appeared for the Turkish side in the 2008 Toulon Tournament, scoring a goal in Turkey's 3–2 victory over the United States.  Turkey, however, would not advance to the next round, finishing third in the group behind Italy and Ivory Coast.

Eren made his debut with the senior National Team on 19 November 2008 in a friendly against Austria. Fatih Terim, the Turkey manager, selected him due to his outstanding form with his club, which saw Kayserispor concede six goals, in the three months since the beginning of the season in August 2008. He currently has five caps with the senior squad.

References

External links
 
 

1988 births
Living people
Turkish footballers
Turkey international footballers
Turkey youth international footballers
Altay S.K. footballers
Kayserispor footballers
Kardemir Karabükspor footballers
Süper Lig players
Turkey under-21 international footballers
Association football central defenders
People from Bergama
Association football defenders